Guillermo Fabián Pereira (born 16 January 1994) is an Argentine professional footballer who plays as a midfielder for Belgrano.

Club career
Pereira is a product of the Douglas Haig youth system, though he left in order to join Independiente in 2008. He made his senior bow in April 2014 against Santamarina in the Copa Argentina, which was his sole appearance for the club. 2015 saw Pereira move to Mexico to play on loan for Athletic Club Morelos of Liga Premier. His first appearance came in a goalless draw with Albinegros de Orizaba on 5 September, which preceded his opening senior goal versus Puebla Premier coming in his second match. A further goal against Pioneros de Cancún across ten more games followed in the Mexican third tier.

A return to Douglas Haig was completed on 15 July 2016 after Pereira terminated his contract with Independiente. He was selected thirty-seven times in his first campaign, which concluded with relegation to Torneo Federal A; where he would score nine goals. June 2018 saw Pereira sign for Primera B Nacional's Los Andes. He made his debut in a home defeat to Independiente Rivadavia on 25 August, which was the first of forty-four appearances across two campaigns with Los Andes. In August 2020, Pereira joined Deportivo Riestra.

On 27 July 2021, Pereira joined Godoy Cruz on a deal until the end of 2022. He later extended his stay at the club into the 2022 season. On 15 June 2022, Pereira moved to Primera Nacional club Belgrano on a deal until the end of 2023.

International career
In 2010, Pereira was selected by José Luis Brown for the Argentina U17s.

Career statistics
.

References

External links

1994 births
Living people
Argentine footballers
Argentine expatriate footballers
People from Pergamino
Association football midfielders
Sportspeople from Buenos Aires Province
Liga Premier de México players
Primera Nacional players
Torneo Federal A players
Primera B Metropolitana players
Club Atlético Independiente footballers
Club Atlético Douglas Haig players
Club Atlético Los Andes footballers
Deportivo Riestra players
Godoy Cruz Antonio Tomba footballers
Club Atlético Belgrano footballers
Expatriate footballers in Mexico
Argentine expatriate sportspeople in Mexico